Franco Sacchi is an Italian filmmaker and editor. He is most notable as the director of critically acclaimed films This Is Nollywood, American Eunuchs and Waiting for Armageddon.

Personal life
He was born Zambia and raised in Italy.

Career
In 2003, he made his first documentary American Eunuchs. The film was screened at and made the official selection at International Documentary Film Festival Amsterdam (IDFA). In 2005, he made his direction This Is Nollywood, a documentary about the Nigerian film industry. The film later won Audience Award at the Abuja International Film Festival. With the success of the film, Franco co-directed and filmed Waiting for Armageddon, which was released on 2010.

Besides directing films, he served as a senior instructor at Avid technology from 1996 to 2002.

Filmography

See also
 Cinema of Africa

References

External links
 

Living people
Italian film directors
Zambian emigrants to Italy
Italian film editors
Year of birth missing (living people)